The Jingde Record of the Transmission of the Lamp, often referred to as The Transmission of the Lamp, is a 30 volume work consisting of putative biographies of the Chan Buddhist and Zen Buddhist patriarchs and other prominent Buddhist monks. It was produced in the Song dynasty by Shi Daoyuan. Other than the Anthology of the Patriarchal Hall, it represents the first appearance of "encounter dialogues" in the Chan tradition, which in turn are the antecedents of the famous kōan stories.

The word Jingde (景德), the first two characters of the title, refers to the Song dynasty reign name, which dates the work to between 1004 and 1007 CE. It is a primary source of information for the history of Chan Buddhism in China, although most scholars interpret the biographies as largely hagiography. The lives of the Zen masters and disciples are systematically listed, beginning with the first seven buddhas (Gautama Buddha is seventh in this list).  The "Lamp" in the title refers to the "Dharma", the teachings of the Buddhism. A total of 1701 biographies are listed in the book. Volumes 1 to 3 are devoted to the history of Indian Buddhism, and the history of Buddhism in China starts in chapter 4 with Bodhidharma. Volume 29 is a collection of gathas, and volume 30 is a collection of songs and other devotional material.

List of Patriarchs

The Seven Buddhas
 Vipashin Buddha
 Shikhin Buddha
 Vessabhu/Vishvabhu Buddha
 Krakucchsnda/Kakusandha Buddha
 Kanakamuni/Konagamana Buddha
 Kasyapa Buddha
 Gotama Buddha

The Twenty-Eight Indian Patriarchs
 Mahakasyapa
 Ananda
 Sanakavasa
 Upagupta
 Dhritaka
 Michaka
 Vasumitra
 Buddhanandi
 Buddhamitra
 Parsva
 Punyayasas
 Ashvaghosa
 Kapimala
 Nagarjuna
 Kanadeva
 Rahulata
 Sanghanandi
 Gayasata
 Kumorata
 Jayata
 Vasubandhu
 Manorhita
 Haklena
 Aryasimha
 Bashyashita
 Punyamitra
 Prajnatara
 Bodhidharma

Six Chinese Patriarchs
 Bodhidharma
 Huike
 Sengcan
 Daoxin
 Hongren
 Huineng

In addition to the acknowledged Chan patriarchs, the Transmission of the Lamp includes biographies or anecdotes involving a number of other figures known in the Chan/Zen tradition, including members of the Oxhead school, Layman Pang, and influential disciples of Chinese masters who were not recognized as patriarchs.

References

External links 
The complete text (in simplified Chinese) of the Transmission of the Lamp is available from Beijing Guoxue (北京国学).

11th-century Buddhism
Zen texts
Zen patriarchs
Chan Buddhism
Chinese Buddhist texts
Song dynasty literature
11th-century Chinese books